Zimmern is a municipality in the Saale-Holzland district of Thuringia, Germany.

References

Municipalities in Thuringia
Saale-Holzland-Kreis